In hurling, the All-Ireland Senior Hurling Championship Final, the deciding match of the All-Ireland Senior Hurling Championship competition, is considered the highest honour for referees to be appointed to officiate.

The most recent final (2021) was refereed by Fergal Horgan, with James Owens on standby; Sean Stack as linesman; Liam Gordon on sideline; and three umpires from Horgan's club Knockavilla Donaskeigh Kickhams and one umpire from Cashel King Cormacs.

Selection
Men who referee a final that ends in a draw cannot also referee the replay. This rule was highlighted in 2019, when David Gough — thought by consensus to have had a good game — was replaced by Conor Lane for the replay. Colm O'Rourke in the Sunday Independent column, "The GAA's view that the referee of a drawn game cannot take the replay defies common sense and logic. Why disqualify a referee when he has done a good job? If the referee is not up to it then certainly he should be left off, but when there is almost universal agreement that he is the best referee in the country then give him all the big games and replays too. The players want the best referees".

Referees are chosen by the Gaelic Athletic Association (GAA) for their impartiality and their assessed performance scores over that championship season. A clue to the identity of the final referee may be found among those chosen to referee All-Ireland quarter-finals. In recent years, a referee who has overseen an All-Ireland semi-final is never chosen for the final. However, he has tended to have refereed a quarter-final.

When the decision is made, the identity of the referee chosen is revealed following the All-Ireland semi-finals and ahead of the final. A period of media attention may ensue, sometimes even before the announcement has been made. It can be a referee's lifetime goal to get this game.

Referees

Pre-1923

1923 to 1969: Introduction of the Liam MacCarthy Cup

1970 to 1996

1997 to present

By county
Since 1997

Referees with more than one final
 = referee still active at inter-county level

 Pat Dunphy (1922) has the distinction of also taking charge of the 1922 All-Ireland Senior Hurling Championship Final in the same year.
 John Dowling (1960) has the distinction of also taking charge of the 1960 All-Ireland Senior Football Championship Final in the same year.
 Jimmy Hatton (1966) has the distinction of also taking charge of the 1966 All-Ireland Senior Football Championship Final in the same year.

See also
 FA Cup Final referees, the closest the English have

References